Provincial Council elections were held on 19 November 1988 to elect members to Sri Lanka’s North Eastern Provincial Council.

Background
The Indo-Lanka Accord signed on 29 July 1987 required the Sri Lankan government to devolve powers to the provinces and, in the meantime, to merge the Northern and Eastern provinces into one administrative unit.

On 14 November 1987 the Sri Lankan Parliament passed the 13th Amendment to the 1978 Constitution of Sri Lanka and the Provincial Councils Act No 42 of 1987, establishing provincial councils. On September 2 and 8 1988 President Jayewardene issued proclamations enabling the Northern and Eastern provinces to be one administrative unit administered by one elected Council.

The first elections for provincial councils took place on 28 April 1988 in North Central, North Western, Sabaragamuwa, and Uva provinces. Elections in the newly merged North Eastern Province were held on 19 November 1988.

Results

Overall

Ampara District

Batticaloa District

Jaffna District
The Eelam People's Revolutionary Liberation Front won all 19 seats uncontested.

Kilinochchi District
The Eelam National Democratic Liberation Front won all 3 seats uncontested.

Mannar District
The Eelam People's Revolutionary Liberation Front won all 5 seats uncontested.

Mullaitivu District
The Eelam National Democratic Liberation Front won all 5 seats uncontested.

Trincomalee District

Vavuniya District
The Eelam National Democratic Liberation Front won all 4 seats uncontested.

Aftermath
On 10 December 1988 Annamalai Varatharajah Perumal of the EPRLF became the first Chief Minister of the North Eastern Provincial Council.

On 1 March 1990, just as the Indian Peace Keeping Force were preparing to withdraw from Sri Lanka, Permual moved a motion in the North Eastern Provincial Council declaring an independent Eelam. President Premadasa reacted to Permual's UDI by dissolving the provincial council and imposing direct rule on the province.

On 14 July 2006, after a long campaign against the merger of the Northern and Eastern provinces, the Janatha Vimukthi Peramuna, a Sinhalese nationalist political party, filed three separate petitions with the Supreme Court of Sri Lanka requesting a separate Provincial Council for the East. On 16 October 2006 the Supreme Court ruled that the proclamations issued by President Jayewardene in September 1988 were null and void and had no legal effect. The North Eastern Province was formally demerged into the Northern and Eastern provinces on 1 January 2007.

The north-east of Sri Lanka was ruled directly from Colombo until May 2008 when elections were held in the demerged Eastern Province. However, the Northern Province continues to be ruled from Government.

References

1988
1988 elections in Asia
1988 in Sri Lanka
November 1988 events in Asia
Indian Peace Keeping Force